Alice Gale (5 December 1858 – 27 March 1941) was an American actress.

Biography
Working with stock theater troupes such as the Grand Stock Company, the Girard Stock Company, and Creston Clarke's company, Gale performed on stage for four decades before making her first film, Sins of Men (1916). She appeared in 11 films between 1916 and 1919, of which only two survive.

Gale was born in Philadelphia, Pennsylvania, and died in Harrisburg, Pennsylvania.

Filmography

 L'apache (1919) *Lost film
 The Birth of a Race (1918)
 Magda (1917)
 Camille (1917) *Lost film
 To-Day (1917) *Lost film
 Heart and Soul (1917) *Lost film
 Her Greatest Love (1917) *Lost film
 The New York Peacock (1917) *Lost film
 The Darling of Paris (1917) *Lost film
 Romeo and Juliet (1916) *Lost film
 Sins of Men (1916)

References

External links

L'Apache(1919) with l to r: Robert Elliott, Dorothy Gish, Alice Gale

1858 births
1941 deaths
American film actresses
American silent film actresses
Actresses from Pennsylvania
20th-century American actresses